Perry Mason is an American legal drama series originally broadcast on CBS television from September 21, 1957, to May 22, 1966. The title character, portrayed by Raymond Burr, is a Los Angeles criminal defense lawyer who originally appeared in detective fiction by Erle Stanley Gardner. Many episodes are based on stories written by Gardner.

Perry Mason was one of Hollywood's first weekly one-hour series filmed for television, and remains one of the longest-running and most successful legal-themed television series. During its first season, it received a Primetime Emmy Award nomination for Outstanding Dramatic Series, and it became one of the five most popular shows on television. Burr received two Emmy Awards for Outstanding Lead Actor in a Drama Series, and Barbara Hale received an Emmy Award for Outstanding Supporting Actress in a Drama Series for her portrayal of Mason's confidential secretary Della Street. Perry Mason and Burr were honored as Favorite Series and Favorite Male Performer in the first two TV Guide Award readers' polls. In 1960, the series received the first Silver Gavel Award presented for television drama by the American Bar Association.

Perry Mason has aired in syndication in the United States and internationally ever since its cancellation, and the complete series has been released on Region 1 DVD. A 2014 study found that Netflix users rate Raymond Burr as their favorite actor, with Barbara Hale number seven on the list.

The New Perry Mason, a 1973 revival of the series with a different cast, was poorly received and ran for 15 episodes. In 1985, Burr returned to play Mason in a successful series of Perry Mason television films airing on NBC. A total of 30 films were made; Burr starred in 26 of them before his death in 1993.

Plot
Perry Mason is a distinguished criminal-defense lawyer practicing in Los Angeles, California, most of whose clients have been wrongly charged with murder. He is ably assisted by his confidential secretary Della Street and by private investigator Paul Drake. The innocent suspect is usually prosecuted by district attorney Hamilton Burger, though the prosecution is handled by a local district attorney when the murder takes place outside Los Angeles County. In the early seasons, the police investigation is usually led by the less imaginative homicide detective Lt. Arthur Tragg.  (Later, other homicide detectives appear with increasing frequency.)

In a typical episode, the first half of the show introduces a client, who often hires Mason on non-murder related business, or becomes acquainted with him in some other way. The prospective murder victim and other important figures in the case are introduced, and then the client finds himself or herself wrongly accused of murder. Once the crime has been committed, while Tragg and Burger work to gather evidence against Mason's innocent client, Mason, Paul Drake and Della Street engage in a parallel investigation in order to exonerate him or her.

In the second half, Mason and Burger spar in the courtroom. This usually takes place during the preliminary hearing because Mason's technique is to clear a client before they are bound over for trial (based on novels).  Jury trials are rarely seen, with "The Case of the Terrified Typist" being an exception. As the courtroom proceedings advance, while Burger and Tragg often uncover new evidence or a new witness that would seem to seal the fate of the accused, Mason's team continue their parallel investigation in what seems to be an increasingly hopeless effort. As the investigation or examination progresses, Mason and sometimes Burger uncover the morally ugly or even illegal conduct of some of the witnesses or participants, thus complicating the moral and legal intrigue of the case.

Eventually, some detail is uncovered, a different interpretation of the evidence is found, or a remark is made inside or outside the courtroom which gives Mason the clue he needs to discover the identity of the real murderer. (For example, in "The Case of the Lazy Lover", the prosecution's case relies on a complicated set of footprints left at the crime scene. Mason notices that the prints left by a neighbor's dog were inconsistent with Burger's interpretation, leading Mason to realize that the neighbor's testimony was contrary to the truth.) Armed with this new insight, Mason then usually embarks upon a line of questioning that reveals the surprise perpetrator, often causing them to break down and confess to the crime in the courtroom. In the closing scene or epilogue, Paul and Della, and sometimes Burger and Tragg, ask Mason what gave him the clue he needed; after Mason explains, he or someone else makes a humorous remark.

Cast and characters

 Perry Mason – played by Raymond Burr – defense attorney.
 Della Street – played by Barbara Hale – Mason's confidential legal secretary.
 Paul Drake – played by William Hopper – owner of the Paul Drake Detective Agency, which employs a number of operatives, and is located in the same building as Perry's law practice. Often, Drake and his operatives do the legwork that allows Perry to assemble the clues that will clear his client. 
 Hamilton Burger – played by William Talman – district attorney. Absent for parts of seasons 3 and 4. (Talman was briefly suspended from the show for violating CBS's morals clause, but was reinstated at the request of executive producer Gail Patrick Jackson and star Raymond Burr, after a letter-writing campaign from viewers.)
LAPD homicide detectives:
 Lieutenant Arthur Tragg – played by Ray Collins – a police homicide detective and lead police official on the series.  He appeared in all but a handful of episodes in seasons 1–3. Illness forced him to appear in fewer and fewer episodes in later seasons: nineteen episodes in season 4, eleven episodes in season 5, nine episodes in season 6, and three episodes in season 7. Collins continued to be billed in every episode through the end of season 8, though he ceased to appear midway through season 7. His last episode was "The Case of the Capering Camera" (season 7, episode 15; first broadcast January 16, 1964).
Lieutenant Anderson – played by Wesley Lau – another police homicide detective and lead police official on the series, known as Andy to his friends. Lau started appearing in the fall of 1961, when Ray Collins began to reduce his participation in the show due to illness, and gradually became more prominent. Lau had previously appeared as another character in "The Case of the Impatient Partner" (season 5, episode 2; first broadcast September 16, 1961). Lt. Anderson was seen in seasons 5–8, beginning with "The Case of the Malicious Mariner" (season 5, episode 4; first broadcast on October 7, 1961) and ending with "The Case of the Mischievous Doll" (season 8, episode 30; first broadcast May 13, 1965).
Lieutenant Steve Drumm – played by Richard Anderson – another police homicide detective and lead police official on the series, who appeared in the final season. Anderson had appeared previously as other lead characters in "The Case of the Accosted Accountant" (season 7, episode 14; first broadcast on January 9, 1964) and "The Case of the Paper Bullets" (season 8, episode 2; first broadcast October 1, 1964).

Recurring smaller roles
 Dr. Hoxie – autopsy surgeon (medical examiner) played by Michael Fox, seen in seasons 1 through 7; Fox also played other small roles in season 9.
 Police Sgt. Ben Landro - a homicide lead detective, played by Mort Mills. Seen infrequently (and never seen in an episode with Tragg, Anderson, or Drumm), Landro appeared in a total of 7 episodes during seasons 4, 5, 6, and 8.  
 Sgt. Brice – a police officer, played by Lee Miller, who often accompanies Tragg, Anderson, or Drumm (but never Landro). Seen throughout the series run.  Miller also played other bit roles in seasons 1 and 2.
 Terrance Clay – played by Dan Tobin. Owner of the upscale Clay's Grill, where Perry, Paul, and Della (and sometimes Burger and/or Drumm) frequently gather in the final (ninth) season, usually during the story's epilogue. Perry, Paul, and Della (and sometimes Burger and Tragg) also frequented Clay's Grill in season 1 — but Clay was never seen in these early episodes.
 Gertrude "Gertie" Lade – Mason's frequently mentioned but rarely seen receptionist, played by Connie Cezon. Capable and friendly, if slightly ditzy, Gertie was seen mostly in seasons 1 and 2, with one appearance in season 4, and then four consecutive episodes in season 7.
 David Gideon – an eager young law student (and initially, a client of Mason's) who occasionally assisted Perry in researching a case. Played by Karl Held in seasons 4 and 5.
 Court clerk – Seen in the background during courtroom procedures. He handled exhibits marked for identification, and he called witnesses to the stand and swore them in. During the first two seasons the clerk was played by Jack Harris. Midway through season 2 George E. Stone took over the clerk's role, and remained with the series through season 6.
 Judges – A rotating pool of judges was seen. The judges were not always consistently named, and were frequently not given a name at all, only being referred to as "Your Honor." Each actor maintained a consistent personality during his sessions on the bench. Often seen were the laid-back S. John Launer (33 episodes, 1958–1966), the sober Kenneth MacDonald (32 episodes, 1957–1966), the formal Willis Bouchey (23 episodes, 1960–1966), the stern Morris Ankrum (22 episodes, 1957–1964), the quizzical John Gallaudet (20 episodes, 1959–1966), the officious Grandon Rhodes (16 episodes, 1957–1966), the tart Richard Gaines (14 episodes, 1958–1961), the calm Nelson Leigh (9 episodes, 1959-1964), and the businesslike Frank Wilcox (8 episodes, 1957-1960). For three cases the judge was a woman: the even-tempered Lillian Bronson (1958-1960). One notable judge was played by Vince Townsend Jr., who appeared in "The Case of the Skeleton's Closet (season 6, episode 26; first broadcast on May 2, 1963); Townsend was an African-American who spoke no lines. He was an actual judge in the Los Angeles County Municipal Court, and was also a minister in the First African Methodist Episcopal Church of Los Angeles. He was the only black judge to appear in the series.

Production

Background

After a series of Warner Bros. films and a radio series he despised, author Erle Stanley Gardner refused to license his popular character Perry Mason for any more adaptations (the radio series, without the Mason character,  would be adapted for television as the long-running crime soap opera The Edge of Night). His literary agent was advertising executive Thomas Cornwell Jackson, who had married actress Gail Patrick in 1947. She had studied law before she went to Hollywood "for a lark" and appeared in more than 60 feature films including My Man Godfrey (1936), Stage Door (1937), and My Favorite Wife (1940). She stopped acting in 1948, started a family, and began to talk to Gardner about adapting the Perry Mason stories for a television series.

"We kept talking about what kind of a series he'd want and how much creative control he needed," Gail Patrick told journalist James Bawden in 1979. "I just think he came to trust me and I'd kept up my contacts in show business."

Gardner regarded Perry Mason's personal life as irrelevant and wanted the series to concentrate on crime and Mason's fight for the underdog. "You must remember," Patrick said, "Erle was in love with the law and its finer points."

Patrick, her husband, and Gardner formed a production company, Paisano Productions, of which she was president. When she first tried to sell Perry Mason to CBS, the network wanted it to be a live hour-long weekly program. "That would have been impossible—it would have killed the actor playing Perry," Patrick said. "And I Love Lucy had taught the value of filmed reruns." Paisano Productions absorbed the costs for a filmed pilot.

In February 1956, CBS announced its new series, Perry Mason, anticipating it would begin that fall. The network obtained the rights to 272 stories by Gardner, including Perry Mason and 11 other principal characters. The rights were purchased from Paisano Productions, which would film the series in association with CBS and own a 60% interest in the films.

Perry Mason was one of Hollywood's first hour-long weekly series filmed for television. Gail Patrick Jackson was its executive producer. "We were the first bona fide law show and we spent two years preparing Perry for the television bar," Patrick said.

Casting
Gail Patrick Jackson was immersed in auditions throughout 1956. Columnist Hedda Hopper wrote that Cornwell Jackson had postponed a two-month vacation in Hawaii, hoping to get the series ready by September or October. In mid-June, Hopper reported that the Jacksons had left on their annual trip, after stating that Perry Mason would not be ready for TV that fall.

The role of Perry Mason proved the hardest to cast. Richard Carlson, Mike Connors, Richard Egan, and William Holden were considered. In early April, Fred MacMurray and CBS were reportedly in the midst of negotiations. Patrick saw hundreds of actors audition in April 1956. "We couldn't afford a big star," Patrick later said. At last, Efrem Zimbalist, Jr., already a star at Warner Bros., was signed without a screen test. 

Raymond Burr initially read for the role of district attorney Hamilton Burger, with Tod Andrews standing in as Mason. Burr was more interested in the Perry Mason role and told associate producer Sam White, "If you don't like me as Perry Mason, then I'll go along and play the part of the district attorney, Hamilton Burger." Patrick had been impressed with Burr's courtroom performance in the 1951 film A Place in the Sun, and told him he was perfect for the title role in Perry Mason, but at least 60 pounds overweight. Over the next month, Burr went on a crash diet. When he returned, he tested as Perry Mason. Burr's tryout performance as Mason was a triumph, according to White: "He was so great that everybody looked at each other and said, 'What do we do now? This guy is far superior. He'll give this thing a dimension that Zimbalist could never give it.'" By July 1956, word was out that Burr had the role, and an announcement was made at the beginning of August.

William Hopper also auditioned as Mason, but was cast as private detective Paul Drake. Patrick recalled, "When Bill Hopper came in to read for Paul Drake he blurted out, 'You hate my mother.' And that was Hedda Hopper. Well, I disliked what she stood for, but 'hate' is something else—and anyway he was perfect as Drake, and we got him."

Barbara Hale was still prominent in feature films, but had a young family and wished to avoid going away on long periods of location shooting. Patrick said that Hale telephoned about the role of Della Street.

Patrick had an actor in mind for the Los Angeles district attorney. "I'd seen a brilliant little movie, The Hitch-Hiker, and had to have William Talman as Burger—and he never disappointed us," Patrick said. Later asked about how he felt about Burger losing to Mason week after week, Talman said, "Burger doesn't lose. How can a district attorney lose when he fails to convict an innocent person? Unlike a fist or gun fight, in court you can have a winner without having a loser. As a matter of fact, Burger in a good many instances has joined Mason in action against unethical attorneys, lying witnesses, or any one else obstructing justice. Like any real-life district attorney, justice is Burger's main interest."

"Ray Collins came on board as Lt. Arthur Tragg," Patrick said. "He was such a wonderful actor—beautiful voice, trained in radio's Mercury Theatre. We overlooked the fact that on an actual police force, he would probably be long retired."  Collins was 68 at the time the series debuted.

Each episode's casting interviews were conducted by Gail Patrick Jackson, producer Ben Brady, and the director. Episodes typically employed 10 featured players in addition to the principal cast and extras. Numerous actors famous for past and future roles in film and television made guest appearances on the show.

"Many were people I'd worked with in movies," said Gail Patrick Jackson. "They were grateful and delivered on time—and powerfully. … Gloria Henry, Vaughn Taylor, Hillary Brooke, John Archer, Morris Ankrum, Don Beddoe, Fay Wray, Olive Blakeney, Paul Fix, Addison Richards. We also had newcomers like Darryl Hickman, Barbara Eden. The trick was to only use them once a year. People like Fay Wray came back several times, but as other characters."

Patrick made it a point to hire her Hollywood acting contemporaries whenever possible. Some were semiretired and financially well-off, but still enjoyed performing. Character actor George E. Stone was impoverished, and for years he appeared on Perry Mason regularly in minor roles until his health made it impossible for him to work any longer. Patrick went to considerable lengths to find a part for an actress who had become paralyzed on one side; she played with her good side toward the camera.

"This isn't being the least altruistic," Patrick said. "They are all fine performers and bring to the shows something interesting and vital—even when they only have one line."

Perry Mason also drew on the distinguished West Coast radio pool. Working steadily in radio since the 1940s, Raymond Burr was a leading player on the West Coast and in 1956 was the star of CBS Radio's Fort Laramie. Noted for his loyalty and consciousness of history, Burr went out of his way to employ his colleagues. Some 180 radio celebrities appeared on Perry Mason during the first season alone.

Writing
The production staff of Perry Mason worked at being technically correct and responsive to an audience that included lawyers and judges. Producer Ben Brady practiced law in New York before entering show business; story editor Gene Wang graduated from law school in Florida; and executive producer Gail Patrick Jackson studied law for two years before becoming an actress.

Many episodes are based on novels and short stories by lawyer-turned-writer Erle Stanley Gardner. Only two of the 69 Perry Mason novels Gardner published before January 1963 were not adapted for the series. All but three episodes in the first season were adapted from Gardner's stories. In season two, 14 of the 39 episodes came from Gardner originals. With the backlist exhausted, later seasons presented between one and five episodes drawn from Gardner stories, with occasional remakes of earlier adaptations.  By the summer of 1958, Patrick was already supervising the work of 31 writers who were developing original scripts based on Gardner's characters.

"Funny thing about writers," Patrick told TV Guide. "A lot of them think they'll improve on Erle. Most of them find out they can't even duplicate him."

Writers submitted a draft script, which was reviewed for continuity, narrative content, and legal error by Patrick and Wang. A revised draft was then forwarded to Gardner, who would respond with a detailed brief indicating particular changes required to conform with the law. Gardner closely supervised the scripts throughout the run of the series, and continued to write new Perry Mason novels.

By 1961, the strictures of the Perry Mason formula led Writer's Digest to declare, "This show has the reputation among writers as being the hardest one in Hollywood to work for."

Filming

Pilot
A test film, "The Case of the Moth-Eaten Mink", ultimately aired December 14, 1957, as the 13th episode of the first season. The pilot was filmed October 3–9, 1956, after Raymond Burr completed a film in Havana and made a two-week tour of military hospitals in the West Indies.

The Case of the Moth-Eaten Mink' is written and directed very much like a noir B-feature of the period, from its stylishly dramatic opening to its violent climax," wrote film scholar Thomas Leitch. He noted that the pilot film "provides a fascinating laboratory for the formula, since it combines trademark elements that would become long-running features of the series with others that would be swiftly abandoned." The episode was directed by Ted Post, whose camera movement, use of deep space, and film noir stylings were softened or absent in subsequent episodes. Laurence Marks and Ben Starr adapted Erle Stanley Gardner's 1952 novel, retaining all its plot features and characters.

In her TV column in early November 1956, journalist Eve Starr reported, "Word is seeping down from CBS brass that its hour-long Perry Mason pilot film is a whooping success, so much so that the show will be held back until a good time period can be found for it next season."

On November 30, 1956, Gardner wrote Gail Patrick Jackson:"I can't get over the feeling that I had sitting there watching that pilot film. … As I saw the manner in which your ideas, your tact and persistence had gradually changed the approach and resulted in a highly polished, finished product I was tremendously proud of you and of my association with you. I think that you saw possibilities in Raymond Burr which no one else saw. I think that you developed those possibilities and I think you have inspired not only the cast but the producers and directors. I think we are on the trail of a highly successful presentation."

Series
The series began filming in April 1957. Each episode was budgeted at $100,000, the equivalent of $ today. Filming took place on Stage 8 at the 20th Century-Fox studios near Western Avenue and Sunset Boulevard (where the show's production offices were located) and at CBS Studio Center, with at least one location in each episode. Burr had lost 100 pounds, but continued to lose weight when filming began: "I just don't have time to eat," he said.

"Every six days Burr stars in what almost amounts to a full-length feature movie," wrote syndicated columnist Erskine Johnson. "He's in 98 percent of all the scenes." This punishing schedule for Burr was soon adjusted, as by midway through the first season a typical Perry Mason episode would open by focusing on the story of the client for most of the first act — Perry himself (and the other regular series characters) might not be introduced until 10–12 minutes into the show.

Still, the workload was enormous.  "I had no life outside of Perry Mason," Burr recalled. "And that went on 24 hours a day, six days a week. I never went home at night. I lived on the lot. I got up at 3 o'clock every single morning to learn my lines for that day, and sometimes I hadn't finished until 9 o'clock. I had a kitchen, bedroom, office space, sitting room—all of that—on every lot I ever worked on."

Thirty-nine episodes were filmed in the first year. "Ray had key lines written on his shirt sleeve cuffs," said Gail Patrick Jackson.

Directors included Laslo Benedek, Jesse Hibbs, Arthur Marks, Christian Nyby, and William D. Russell. Some, including Lewis Allen and Richard Donner, had or would have notable directing credits in feature films. Many episodes incorporated the essential elements of film noir.

"The crew is giving it the best of Hollywood's techniques," Burr told columnist Erskine Johnson. The crew included veterans including art director Lewis Creber, make-up artist Mel Berns, cinematographer Frank Redman, editor Richard Cahoon and sound mixer Harry M. Leonard.

All but one of the episodes in the series were filmed in black-and-white. The episode "The Case of the Twice-Told Twist", an episode heavily influenced by Charles Dickens's Oliver Twist, was the sole exception. The president of CBS, William Paley, commissioned the color episode so he could see what the show would look like in color, should it be renewed for a 10th season (the season most prime time shows went color).

Locations

Perry Mason is set in Los Angeles; interior scenes were filmed on the 20th Century-Fox Western Avenue studio lot, and most exteriors were filmed at Fox Studios in Westwood, California, or the Movie Ranch in Malibu Canyon. Later episodes in the series were filmed at the former Charlie Chaplin Studios in Hollywood.

In the early years of the series, filming would be done on location in and around Culver City and a few downtown locales. In one episode, Drake gets out of a car on Wilshire Boulevard and goes into an apartment building; in the distant background, the lights and cameras from the set filming an episode of Peter Gunn are visible. Numerous establishing shots are used, including the iconic Civic Center, Los Angeles, the Hall of Justice building and the Los Angeles County Court House which is now the Stanley Mosk Courthouse. All of these buildings are still standing.

Mason's offices are in the Brent Building, Suite 904, phone MAdison 5–1190. In Season 8 the number for the office is 272-2199. Although the Brent Building is fictional, the series used the entrance and exterior of the former Superior Oil Company Building, a modern architecture structure in downtown Los Angeles completed in 1956. The building was registered in 2003 as a historical landmark and is now part of Standard Hotels.

Scattered throughout the run were episodes that would take place beyond Burger's jurisdiction as Los Angeles County District Attorney. In 1960, when William Talman, who played Hamilton Burger, was suspended for allegedly violating the morals clause in his contract, several assistant prosecutors were seen in court.  Talman had attended a party at which he was charged with having engaged in indecent activities.  He was later acquitted, and largely through the efforts of Burr, Talman was reinstated to the show.

Music
The show's theme music is one of the most recognizable in television. Composer Fred Steiner set out to write a theme that would project the two primary aspects of Mason's character—sophistication and toughness. "The piece he came up with, titled "Park Avenue Beat", pulsed with the power of the big city and the swagger of a beefy hero played to perfection by actor Raymond Burr," wrote the Los Angeles Times. Described by Steiner as "a piece of symphonic R&B", the Perry Mason theme heard at the opening and end credits became the composer's best-known work.

Much of the incidental music was drawn from the CBS-TV Music Library. This included music by Bernard Herrmann, who went uncredited since the cues were stock music that was edited into the score. Herrmann's music has been identified in the following episodes: "The Case of the Restless Redhead", "The Case of the Sleepwalker's Niece", "The Case of the Nervous Accomplice", The Case of the Drowning Duck", "The Case of the Silent Partner", "The Case of the Half-Wakened Wife", "The Case of the Calendar Girl", "The Case of the Spurious Sister" and "The Case of the Mythical Monkeys". Production records show Herrmann's music being used in 100 episodes, through "The Case of the Tandem Target" (Season 7, Episode 29).

Cancellation

Perry Mason aired Saturday nights for its first five seasons, outdrawing competition including the first two seasons of NBC's Bonanza. Bonanza jumped to number two in the Nielsen ratings when it moved to Sunday nights in 1961. In 1962, CBS moved Perry Mason to Thursday nights, where it easily won the ratings for its time slot.

"CBS just got plain cocky," said executive producer Gail Patrick Jackson. "It irritated the suits to no end that Sundays at 8 was The Ed Sullivan Show with his huge rating, and then everybody switched to NBC's Bonanza. William S. Paley would rant about this every time we met." Patrick continued:

Then, for the September '65 season he floored me by telling the affiliates we'd be going Sundays at 9 with a mandate to demolish Bonanza. Just like that. He finally let me shoot in color but we never had a chance. We improved ratings for CBS but Bonanza was the leader and Paley simply cancelled us completely in 1966. After nine seasons and 271 episodes we were dust."

The network gave no particular reason for the cancellation. "CBS figures we are worn out," Patrick told The New York Times in November 1965. "But this season the show is getting more mail than ever before and so is Raymond."

Burr had wanted to leave Perry Mason after five years, but was always persuaded to extend his contract. Network executives implored him to stay for a tenth season, to be filmed in color. "They shot one show in color and I said 'no'," Burr recalled, "and they gave me such a big thing, talked about my loyalty and all that, and they guaranteed the quality of the show and said, 'Let's go off with a big bang.' This was all of the people at CBS." Burr agreed to do the tenth season. Three weeks after the meeting, he picked up the trade papers and read that the series had been cancelled.

The last episode of the series, "The Case of the Final Fade-Out", was filmed April 12–19, 1966. Set in a TV film studio where two murders occur, the last show offered the entire production crew an opportunity to appear on camera. Most of the behind-the-scenes personnel in the episode had been with the show the entire nine years. Patrick made a cameo appearance herself, and persuaded Erle Stanley Gardner to make his acting debut as the judge who presides over the second trial.

Other adaptations

Preceding the 1957 series, a series of movies were made in the 1930s, as well as a radio show that started airing in 1943.

At least three series have been made about the Perry Mason character after the cancellation of the 1957 series, including a series of television films for NBC, starting with Perry Mason Returns in 1985, featuring the two then-surviving cast members, Raymond Burr and Barbara Hale.

Other attempts include a short-lived 1973 series, also at CBS, and more recently, a 2020 HBO series.

Episodes 

When asked by a fan why Perry Mason won every case, Burr told her, "But madam, you see only the cases I try on Saturday."

Mason is known to have lost, in some form or manner, three cases—"The Case of the Terrified Typist," "The Case of the Witless Witness," and "The Case of the Deadly Verdict."

Mason also loses a civil case at the beginning of "The Case of the Dead Ringer," partly due to being framed for witness tampering. His staff and he then spend the rest of the episode trying to prove his innocence. They eventually do, and although this is not stated explicitly, the verdict of the civil case is presumably either overturned or declared a mistrial. In a July 15, 2009, interview on NPR's program All Things Considered, Barbara Hale claimed that all of Mason's lost cases were declared mistrials off the air.

Mason did lose, at least by inference, a capital case mentioned in the 1958 episode "The Case of the Desperate Daughter." Mason and Della Street are first seen preparing a last-minute appeal for a "Mr. Hudson" who has an impending date with the gas chamber.

Broadcast

Broadcast history
Perry Mason aired on CBS from September 21, 1957, to May 22, 1966.
 Saturday at 7:30 p.m. ET September 21, 1957 – May 26, 1962 (Seasons 1–5)
 Thursday at 8 p.m. ET September 27, 1962 – May 16, 1963 (Season 6)
 Thursday at 9 p.m. ET September 26, 1963 – May 21, 1964 (Season 7)
 Thursday at 8 p.m. ET September 24, 1964 – May 13, 1965 (Season 8)
 Sunday at 9 p.m. ET September 12, 1965 – May 22, 1966 (Season 9)

Syndication
At the time of its cancellation, Perry Mason was or had been airing in 58 countries, subtitled in ten languages and dubbed in ten more.

Perry Mason has been a staple in syndication, running for many years on local television stations (including WGN-TV in the 1990s when it was a Chicago-based superstation), TBS and on the Hallmark Channel. Originally, only 195 of the 271 episodes were available to stations. These episodes included all of the first six seasons (except the four Season 6 episodes in which Raymond Burr makes only brief appearances), four episodes of Season 7, and 14 episodes of the ninth and final season (including the final episode). It was not until the mid-1980s when TBS obtained the rights to the remaining episodes that all 271 Perry Mason episodes were seen in syndication.

Episodes broadcast in syndicated re-runs are usually heavily edited, to allow for more time for commercials.

The TV series is currently shown weekdays on Me-TV and FETV, as well as on local stations in various local markets. Portland, Oregon station KPTV first aired evening repeats of Perry Mason in 1966. In 1970, the station began the long tradition of showing reruns of Perry Mason weekdays during its noon time slot. This unprecedented run ended 42 years later, on September 3, 2012, when KPTV ceased broadcasting the show. It continued to be shown on KPDX, duopoly of KPTV, in the 8 AM time slot through September 12, 2014. The series was distributed by CBS Films, then Viacom Enterprises, Paramount Domestic Television and CBS Paramount Domestic Television, CBS Television Distribution, and now by CBS Media Ventures.

CBS posted full 60-minute episodes on its website from the first and second seasons for viewing.

Video on demand
A 2014 article in The Atlantic that examined how Netflix categorized nearly 77,000 different personalized genres found that Perry Mason star Raymond Burr was rated as the favorite actor by Netflix users. Barbara Hale was rated seventh. Christian I. Nyby II, the director of many of the television movies, and his father Christian Nyby, who directed many episodes of the TV series, led the list of directors. Todd Yellin, vice president of product innovation for Netflix and the person who designed the system, was at a loss to explain what journalist Alexis Madrigal called "this weird Perry Mason thing".

Reception

"Perry Mason was television's most successful and longest-running lawyer series," wrote TV historian Tim Brooks. "It remains, I think, the best detective series ever made for television," wrote film historian Jon Tuska. "The definitive portrayal, of course, was by former screen heavy Raymond Burr on the CBS series (1957–1966) in scripts faithfully based on Gardner's novels", wrote mystery writer Max Allan Collins.

Ratings

Awards

Emmy Awards
 1958: Perry Mason was nominated as Primetime Emmy Award for Outstanding Drama Series at the 10th Primetime Emmy Awards
 1959: Raymond Burr received the Emmy Award for Primetime Emmy Award for Outstanding Lead Actor in a Drama Series at the 11th Primetime Emmy Awards.
 1959: Barbara Hale received the Emmy Award for Primetime Emmy Award for Outstanding Supporting Actress in a Dramatic Series at the 11th Primetime Emmy Awards.
 1959: William Hopper was nominated as Primetime Emmy Award for Outstanding Supporting Actor in a Drama Series at the 11th Primetime Emmy Awards.
 1960: Raymond Burr received a nomination for Outstanding Performance by an Actor in a Series (Lead or Support) at the 12th Primetime Emmy Awards.
 1961: Raymond Burr received the Emmy Award for Outstanding Performance by an Actor in a Series (Lead) at the 13th Primetime Emmy Awards.
 1961: Barbara Hale was nominated for Outstanding Performance in a Supporting Role by an Actor or Actress in a Series at the 13th Primetime Emmy Awards.
 1961: Perry Mason was nominated for Outstanding Achievement in Film Editing for Television at the 13th Primetime Emmy Awards.
 1966: Perry Mason received an Emmy nomination for Individual Achievements in Electronic Production – Audio Engineering at the 18th Primetime Emmy Awards.

TV Guide Awards
 1960: Perry Mason was honored as Favorite Series in TV Guide magazine's inaugural TV Guide Award readers poll.
 1960: Raymond Burr received the first annual TV Guide Award for Favorite Male Performer, for Perry Mason.
 1961: Perry Mason received the second annual TV Guide Award for Favorite Series.
 1961: Raymond Burr received the second annual TV Guide Award for Favorite Male Performer, for Perry Mason.

Silver Gavel Award
 1960: Perry Mason received the first Silver Gavel Award for television drama presented by the American Bar Association. Raymond Burr accepted the award for Paisano Productions.

Influence
In her Supreme Court nomination before the United States Senate Committee on the Judiciary in July 2009, Supreme Court nominee Sonia Sotomayor prefaced her remarks on the role of the prosecutor by saying that she was inspired by watching Perry Mason as a child. "I was influenced so greatly by a television show in igniting the passion that I had as being a prosecutor, and it was Perry Mason", Sotomayor said. In her 2013 memoir the Associate Justice of the Supreme Court of the United States wrote of the show's influence on her while she was growing up in a Bronx housing project. She granted that the defense attorney was the show's hero, "but my sympathies were not entirely monopolized by Perry Mason. I was fond of Burger, the prosecutor, too. I liked that he was a good loser, that he was more committed to finding the truth than to winning his case. If the defendant was truly innocent, he once explained, and the case was dismissed, then he had done his job because justice had been served." She was particularly fascinated by the judge.

"There was a whole new vocabulary here," Sotomayor wrote. "And though I wasn't sure what every detail meant, I followed the gist of it. It was like the puzzles I enjoyed, a complex game with its own rules, and one that intersected with grand themes of right and wrong. I was intrigued and determined to figure it out."

Cultural references

A Perry Mason parody titled "The Night That Perry Masonmint Lost a Case" appeared in the July 1959 issue of Mad magazine.

Raymond Burr made a guest appearance in an episode of The Jack Benny Program, titled "Jack on Trial for Murder" (November 5, 1961). He appears in character as Perry Mason in Benny's dream sequence about being tried for killing a rooster. Other Perry Mason cast include Grandon Rhodes as the process server, Frank Wilcox as the judge and George E. Stone as court clerk.

The character of Perry Mason was spoofed in an episode of the animated series The Flintstones, titled "Little Bamm-Bamm" (October 3, 1963). When the Rubbles try to adopt Bamm-Bamm, they end up in court facing attorney "Perry Masonry, who's never lost a case".

The Blues Brothers recorded a cover version of Fred Steiner's Perry Mason TV series theme for the 1980 album Made in America. It was later used in the 1998 film Blues Brothers 2000 and released on the soundtrack album.

Perry Mason was satirized in a 1990 episode of the Australian sketch comedy series Fast Forward.

Ozzy Osbourne's 1995 album, Ozzmosis, opens with a track titled "Perry Mason". Released as a single, the song was the first to integrate the music of Perry Mason into what one reviewer described as a "bruising rocker … complete with an ominous excerpt from the classic TV show theme".

In the video game Apollo Justice: Ace Attorney, the system of saved data from courts, the MASON System, was named in reference to Perry Mason.

"Suicide", a song by the Irish hard rock band Thin Lizzy, was inspired by the episode "The Case of the Lover's Leap" (season 6, episode 23). It appears on the band's 1975 album Fighting.

Perry Mason is referenced a number of times in AMC's Better Call Saul, the prequel to Breaking Bad, most notably in the episode "Chicanery", when Chuck McGill says that his brother, Jimmy McGill, wants to "Split me apart at the seams like a murderer confessing on an episode of Perry Mason" (which does indeed end up happening).

Home media

United States and Canada
CBS Home Entertainment has released all nine seasons of Perry Mason on Region 1 DVD. Each season was released in two-volume half-season sets because each season of Perry Mason contains considerably more material than a modern TV series. The first season of Perry Mason featured 39 episodes, Season 3 had 26 episodes, and all other seasons had either 28 or 30 episodes; this compares with 22 for a typical modern series. In addition, Perry Mason episodes are 50–53 minutes long, while a 2014 Nielsen study found that modern one-hour shows are shortened to accommodate 14 to 15 minutes of commercials.

The DVDs contain the original full-length version of each episode. Episodes broadcast in syndicated re-runs are usually heavily edited, to allow for more commercial time.

In April 2008, a special 50th anniversary DVD set was released with selected episodes from the then-unreleased Seasons 3–9. Barbara Hale, sometimes joined by director and producer Arthur Marks, provides an on-camera introduction to each episode. Bonus material includes the 1956 film tests of Burr and Hopper, just discovered in the CBS vaults; interviews with Hale, Marks, and CBS executive Anne Roberts Nelson; a short documentary about Erle Stanley Gardner; a cast appearance on Pantomime Quiz; a 1958 Person to Person segment in which Burr (at his home in Malibu) is interviewed by Charles Collingwood; two CBS News Nightwatch interviews of Burr by Charlie Rose; the anti-smoking public service announcement William Talman made on behalf of the American Cancer Society shortly before his death from lung cancer; and the first of the made-for-TV movies, Perry Mason Returns. Film historian Stuart Galbraith IV called the 50th anniversary set "a must-have … especially for its extra features".

Region 1 DVD releases

International

Region 2 DVD releases
In Region 2, Paramount Home Entertainment has released the first three seasons in complete sets on DVD in the UK.

Region 4 DVD releases
In Region 4, Paramount Home Entertainment has released the first two seasons on DVD in Australia/New Zealand.  These releases are similar to the Region 1 releases whereby each season has been released in two-volume sets.

Via Vision Entertainment re-released the series in Australia in 2019.

See also

 Perry Mason moment
 Perry Mason syndrome

Notes

References

External links

 Perry Mason at CBS.com
 
 Perry Mason TV Series Wiki
 Perry Mason TV Showbook
 Perry Mason's Page

 
Courtroom drama television series
1950s American legal television series
1960s American legal television series
1950s American mystery television series
1960s American mystery television series
1950s American drama television series
1960s American drama television series
1957 American television series debuts
1966 American television series endings
American legal drama television series
Black-and-white American television shows
CBS original programming
English-language television shows
Television shows based on American novels
Television shows set in Los Angeles
Television shows filmed in Los Angeles
Television series by CBS Studios